Karl Pruner is a Canadian actor whose most notable work is in portraying Canadian Prime Minister John Turner in the 2002 mini-series Trudeau.

Career 
Amongst his other work, he did voice acting as Beta Ray Bill in the short-lived animated series Silver Surfer. In 2003 he appeared in Burn: The Robert Wraight Story. In 1999, Pruner played detective Ian Farve, a leading role in the television series Total Recall: 2070.

In 2005, Pruner was elected president of the Toronto chapter of the ACTRA.

Filmography

Film

Television

Awards 
 2004 Canadian Comedy Award - Expecting - Nominated (shared with Valerie Buhagiar, Deborah Day, Angela Gei, Karen Hill, Derwin Jordan, Debra McGrath, Tom Melissis, Colin Mochrie, Barbara Radecki, Cindy Stone) - Nominated
 1990 Gemini Award for Best Performance by a Supporting Actor - E.N.G. - Nominated

References

External links 

Hotflick images
 Karl Pruner; ETM LTD Resume
 ACTRA Toronto Elects Pruner; BackStage, January 20, 2005

Living people
Canadian male film actors
Canadian male television actors
Canadian male voice actors
Year of birth missing (living people)